Battlestar Galactica: Human vs. Cylon is a pair of steel, dueling roller coasters at Universal Studios Singapore. One of the coasters is an inverted roller coaster track in blue (gray from 2017 onwards), and the other half is a traditional seated roller coaster in red. The coasters, which opened in 2010 and was inactive between 2013 and 2015, reach  in height and are the tallest dueling coasters in the world.

Universal Studios Singapore is the only Universal Studios amusement park to have a Battlestar Galactica roller coaster. It was the first Vekoma coaster, after the Flying Dutchman, to feature four-abreast seating that is similar to coasters by Bolliger & Mabillard.

Coasters
The roller coaster trains are launched from their stations at high speed instead of the traditional chain lift. Linear Synchronous Motors (LSM) are used for high-acceleration speed during launching. Similar to the now-defunct Dragon Challenge at Universal's Islands of Adventure, these coasters feature several near collisions mere inches apart. Part of the ride took place over the park's central lagoon.

Battlestar Galactica: Cylon

The Cylon coaster is a coaster designed like the Cylon Raider suspended from the track with legs free that performs intense manoeuvres that includes five inversions, a cobra roll, a corkscrew, a vertical loop and a zero-g roll. It also includes sudden turns close to buildings emphasising the sensation of a near miss. Before the ride starts, a short monologue spoken by a robotic voice states “This has all happened before. This will all happen again.”

Ride Description
The ride is a suspended coaster capable of reaching speeds up to 51.0 mph (82.1 km/h) and has 5 inverted parts.

Battlestar Galactica: Human

Pre-show

The queue for the Human ride firstly is a narrow walkway. The riders enter the ride building where Galactica Actual and Cag Starbuck explain the mission. Then the riders are loaded into the trains. Upon departure, the riders hear the dialogue, "Happy Hunting. So say we all."

Ride Description 

The Human coaster is designed like the Colonial Mark II Viper for riders who want a roller coaster experience without inversions. According to Universal Studios Singapore engineers, riders on the Human track experience more G-forces than those on the Cylon track.

History

On 18 March 2010, Battlestar Galactica: Human vs. Cylon was one of the 16 attractions that opened during Universal Studios Singapore's soft opening. A week after its opening, Universal Studios Singapore identified a problem in a ride vehicle during routine testing. The ride closed for repair on 25 March 2010. Both rides remained closed for about 11 months thereafter.

In August 2010, Resorts World Sentosa publicly addressed the reason for closure of the ride, stating that the problem lies with the design of the ride vehicles and not the track layout. Higher than anticipated stress and vibration levels caused fatigue cracks to develop in the seat-post supports of the "Human" coaster car. The redesigned component was to eliminate the weld entirely and was also to be installed with additional strength-reinforcement parts. Extensive ride testing cycles and inspections were conducted, as the ride needed to be re-certified before it reopened to the public. In early February 2011, Universal Studios Singapore announced the rides would re-open on 21 February 2011.

On 21 December 2010, Battlestar Galactica: Human vs. Cylon entered the final testing stage with newly reinforced cars for both the "Human" and "Cylon" coasters. The ride was scheduled to re-open in the first half of 2011. On 4 February 2011, the ride was opened unofficially for "technical rehearsals", with the ride scheduled to reopen on 21 February 2011.

On 21 July 2013, the ride was closed again for review. More than a year passed before Resorts World Sentosa announced, in November 2014, that Battlestar Galactica: Human vs Cylon would reopen in early 2015 with new trains. On 25 May 2015, Universal Studios Singapore announced that the ride will return with all-new ride vehicles on 27 May 2015. The ride was reopened officially two days later, with the ride vehicles being changed from four-abreast seating to two-abreast seating. On 6 April 2016 riders were stuck for about an hour when a technical error occurred on the ride.

See also
 List of amusement rides based on film franchises
 Universal Studios Singapore
 Battlestar Galactica
 Dragon Challenge

References

Battlestar Galactica
Roller coasters operated by Universal Parks & Resorts
Roller coasters introduced in 2010
Roller coasters in Singapore
Universal Studios Singapore
Universal Parks & Resorts attractions by name
2010 establishments in Singapore
Outer space in amusement parks